Lorenzo Bilotti (born 21 September 1994) is an Italian bobsledder. He competed at the 2018 and 2022 Winter Olympics.

References

1994 births
Living people
Bobsledders at the 2018 Winter Olympics
Bobsledders at the 2022 Winter Olympics
Italian male bobsledders
Olympic bobsledders of Italy